"Universal Soldier" is a song written and composed by Canadian singer-songwriter Buffy Sainte-Marie. The first released recording was a single by The Highwaymen, released in September 1963. The song was also released on Sainte-Marie's debut album It's My Way!, released in April 1964.  "Universal Soldier" was not an immediate popular hit at the time of its release, but it did garner attention within the contemporary folk music community. It became a hit a year later when Donovan covered it, as did Glen Campbell. Sainte-Marie said of the song: "I wrote 'Universal Soldier' in the basement of The Purple Onion coffee house in Toronto in the early sixties. It's about individual responsibility for war and how the old feudal thinking kills us all." The idea was based on that politicians, with power over the military, in democratic states are elected by the people.

Sainte-Marie has said she approached writing the song from the perspective of a student writing an essay for a professor who didn't see eye-to-eye with her perspective, hoping to present him with a different point of view.

Composition
In the six verses of the song, a soldier of different heights, ages, religious and political backgrounds is depicted, fighting in different times, for different countries (starting with Canada, where Buffy Sainte-Marie comes from), and with different motives, always thinking that he is fighting for peace but never realizing he is part of the problem. The song ends with:

Sainte-Marie sold the publishing rights to the song, but later bought them back for $25,000.

Donovan cover

By 1965, the song had caught the attention of budding folk singer Donovan, who recorded it using a similar arrangement to Buffy Sainte-Marie's original recording. In Donovan's version, Dachau became Liebau (Lubawka, Poland), a training center for Hitler Youth.  Donovan's recording was released on an EP titled The Universal Soldier in the United Kingdom (August 15, 1965). The EP continued Donovan's run of high charting releases in the UK by reaching No. 5 on the charts. The tracks on the EP are "Universal Soldier"; "The Ballad of a Crystal Man" b/w "Do You Hear Me Now?" (Bert Jansch); "The War Drags On" (Mick Softley).

The lack of interest in the EP format within the United States led Hickory Records to release the song as a single in September 1965. Donovan's cover of "Universal Soldier" was backed with another track from the British EP: Bert Jansch's "Do You Hear Me Now?". Donovan's US release of "Universal Soldier" also became a hit, charting higher than his previous single "Colours" and ultimately reaching No. 53 on the Billboard charts and No. 21 in Canada, co-charting with Glen Campbell's version.  This success led Hickory Records to include the song on the United States release of Donovan's second album, Fairytale, replacing a cover of Bert Jansch's "Oh Deed I Do".  Cash Box described it as "a plaintive, twangy, medium-paced message-song which takes a strong anti-war stand."

Sainte-Marie was glad that Donovan's success with this song got more people to hear it.

Other covers
 Glen Campbell (#45 US, No. 16 AUS, No. 4 SWE, No. 21 CAN)
 Chumbawamba
 Heikki Harma, 1965, lyrics in Finnish, called "Palkkasoturi" ("The Mercenary")
 Boudewijn de Groot, lyrics in Dutch, called "De eeuwige soldaat"
 Juliane Werding, lyrics in German, called "Der Ewige Soldat"
 Ámmun Johnskareng a Northern Sami, lyrics in Sami, called "Máilmmálaš soalddát"
 Bettina Wegner, lyrics in German, called "Soldaten"
 Toni Vescoli, lyrics in Swiss German, called "De-r-eewig Soldat"
 Mariusz Zadura, lyrics in Polish, called "Żołnierz tego świata" ("The soldier of this world")
 Lobo, 1974, on his album Just a Singer
 Aimee Allen, performed at the Target Center in 2008 during Campaign for Liberty's "Rally for the Republic", hosted by Ron Paul
 First Aid Kit, 2011, for Jack White's Third Man Records tri-color vinyl series
 Jake Bugg, 2013, performed exclusively for ONE's Agit8 campaign

Response
In 1965, Jan Berry of Jan and Dean released as a single an answer song presenting the opposite point of view, titled "The Universal Coward", which criticized anti-war protesters. Dean Torrence objected and did not participate.

Quoted unknowingly in Smithsonian article
Lyrics from this song (ending in "without you all this killing can't go on") were quoted in Owen Edwards' article "Kilroy Was Here" in the October 2004 edition of Smithsonian. The author identifies the lyrics as "free verse" from "a mysterious poem" that was found written on a cot from a Vietnam War era troopship. The true authorship of the words was provided by more than 285 readers who wrote in to provide a correction.

See also
 List of anti-war songs

References

External links 
 lyrics
 Universal Soldier (Single) – Donovan Unofficial Site

Songs about soldiers
Songs about the military
1963 songs
Anti-war songs
Donovan songs
Buffy Sainte-Marie songs
Protest songs
Glen Campbell songs
Folk rock songs
Songs written by Buffy Sainte-Marie
1965 singles
The Highwaymen (folk band) songs